Kathleen Cotter is a former camogie player, captain of the All Ireland Camogie Championship winning team in 1936 She was substituted in the course of the All Ireland final.

References

External links
 Camogie.ie Official Camogie Association Website

Cork camogie players
Year of birth missing
Possibly living people